Talumpati is the 5th (overall) studio album and his last album for Sony Music of Filipino rapper, Gloc-9. It has 16 tracks and released under Musiko Records & Sony Music Philippines. The album has been available in the record bars since January 23, 2011 though its launching happened on February 23 in the same year at Eastwood City, Quezon City.

Track listing

Singles

Walang Natira
Walang Natira is the first single of Gloc-9 off his fifth album Talumpati. The song features Pinoy Dream Academy season 2 alumna, Sheng Belmonte.

References

External links
 www.sonymusic.com.ph/
 Gloc 9 - Talumpati Album review by Youngmaze | Flipclan.com

Gloc-9 albums
2011 albums